John Henry Howe (1913–1997) was an American architect who started as an apprentice in 1932 under American architect Frank Lloyd Wright in Wright's Taliesin Fellowship. He was Wright's head draftsman from the late 1930s until Wright's death in 1959, left the Taliesin Fellowship in 1964, and, beginning in 1967, opened an architectural practice in Minneapolis, Minnesota. He died in California in 1997.

Biography
Howe was born in Evanston, Illinois, on May 17, 1913. He lived and worked at Taliesin in Wisconsin and Taliesin West in Arizona from 1932 to 1964. He was one of Frank Lloyd Wright's first apprentices in the Taliesin Fellowship, beginning the year it opened, 1932. He became the chief draftsman in 1937 during construction of Fallingwater by Frank Lloyd Wright.

Howe was a conscientious objector during World War II and was placed in a Civilian Public Service (CPS) camp in Sandstone, Minnesota from 1943 to 1946 after which he returned to Taliesin. In 1947, he met Lu Sparks, and they married in 1951. Howe remained in the Taliesin Fellowship after Wright's death in 1959, and worked in Wright's successor firm, Taliesin Associated Architects, until 1964. After that, Howe went to California to work with former Wright apprentice Aaron Green (who was also Wright's representative in California) until 1967.

In 1967, Howe moved to Minnesota with his wife, Lu Sparks Howe, and opened an architecture office in Minneapolis. He retired in 1992 and moved to Novato, California, with his wife. He died in Novato September 21, 1997.

Buildings
Wright buildings worked on by Howe include:
 Fallingwater
 Hanna-Honeycomb House
 Thomas Keys Residence
 Patrick and Margaret Kinney House
 Kenneth and Phyllis Laurent House
 Herman T. Mossberg Residence
 Melvyn Maxwell and Sara Stein Smith House
 Clarence Sondern House
 William & Mary Palmer House
 Robert H. Sunday House
 Duey and Julia Wright House (no relation to the architect)
 Marin County Civic Center

After Wright's death, Howe became the chief draftsman of Taliesin Associated Architects (the successor firm after Wright). He left in 1964 to work with Aaron Green, another former Wright apprentice who was a practicing architect in California. Howe stayed with Green until 1967. He decided to move to Minnesota and establish his architecture practice in Minneapolis. 

As a practicing architect, Howe "refused to change the natural contours of a building site", and would only design the building after walking on the site.

Selected houses in Minnesota by Howe:
 Jerpbak house, Braemar Hills, Edina. 1969–70
 Weston house, Indian Hills, Edina. 1980
 Howe's own home, Sankaku, Horseshoe Lake, Burnsville. 1971

References

Further reading
 John H. Howe, Architect: From Taliesin Apprentice to Master of Organic Design, by Jane King Hession and Tim Quigley. Foreword by Bruce Brooks Pfeiffer. University Of Minnesota Press. 2015.

External links
 John H. Howe, Architect Frank Lloyd Wright's Master of Perspective from JohnHoweMovie.com
 John H. Howe, Architect
 Wisconsin Historical Society John H. Howe Collected Papers, 1887-2013 (bulk 1930-1993)
 Three Historic Homes by Architect John Howe

1913 births
1997 deaths
20th-century American architects
Architects from Illinois
American conscientious objectors
Frank Lloyd Wright
People from Evanston, Illinois